Danviksbron or, alternatively, Danviksbro ("Danvik Bridge") is a bascule bridge in central Stockholm, Sweden, connecting the eastern end of Södermalm to the eastern municipality Nacka.  Under the bridge, the canal Hammarbykanalen carries the water of Hammarby Sjö over to Saltsjön. The bridge, actually two separate bridges, carries the railway Saltsjöbanan and a road.

For unknown reasons the location of the bridge, like many other places along the shores of Sweden and Norway, was named 'Danviken', meaning danernas vik, "The Bay of the Danes", and until the early 20th century most people called it Dannviken (short a, like Danmark is still pronounced) rather than, as is common today, Daanviken (long a).

History 
Since King Gustav Vasa (1496–1560) had the water level of the lake Hammarbysjön increased by 4.8 metres, the lake emptied into Saltsjön through a small rivulet overshadowed by a simple wooden bridge and the familiar silhouette of an old mill, and for many centuries Danviken remained mostly renowned for its hospital, Danviks hospital, which the king had moved from Riddarholmen near the city.

In 1922, a railway viaduct built in 1893 was demolished together with the old bridge, both replaced by a single-leaf bascule bridge with its concrete counterweight hanging over the 14 metres wide roadway shared by trains and vehicles. This bridge is a fixed-trunnion bridge type and a copy of a Joseph Strauss design.

On the eastern side of the canal a concrete viaduct connected to the bridge, and the bridge's load-carrying steel trusses left a horizontal clearance of 12.5 metres for the ships below.

To deal with increasing postwar traffic loads, the capacity of the bridge was increased in 1956 by adding a new bridge south of and parallel to the old, the two structures separated by less than a metre. The new bridge was 22.2 metres wide, of which 14 metres were used by vehicles, and 5 metres for bicycles and pedestrians, which effectively left the trains and bicyclists have the old bridge for themselves.  A single-leaf bascule bridge was chosen again, but this time having in mind that the canal was prospected to be widened, which would hopefully be done easily by adding more bridge to the present unaltered structure.

By the 1970s traffic had increased enough again to motivate a redevelopment of the traffic system surrounding the bridge and the enlargement of the bridge itself.  This was done in the period 1973–1977 by replacing one of the open-web girders with a steel girder underlying the deck, thus giving space for additional cantilevering roadways.

Plans

There were plans to a new high double-track tramway bridge, carrying the Saltsjöbanan railway without delays for any bridge openings. Rising cost estimates (about 3 bn SEK plus more at Slussen station etc.) have caused the plans to be cancelled. Instead a new metro line will be built between Kungsträdgården and Nacka.

See also 
 List of bridges in Stockholm
 Saltsjöbanan
 Slussen

References

External links 

 webbkameror.se - Webcam at Danviksbron
 Stockholmskällan - Historical images of Danviksbron.

Bridges in Stockholm
Bridges completed in 1922
Bridges completed in 1956
Railway bridges in Sweden
Rail infrastructure in Stockholm County
Bascule bridges